The 1919 East Antrim by-election was held on 27 May 1919.  The by-election was held due to the appointment of Commander of the Irish guards of the incumbent Irish Unionist MP, Robert McCalmont.  It was won by the Independent Unionist candidate George Boyle Hanna.

Result

References

External links 
A Vision Of Britain Through Time

1919 elections in the United Kingdom
By-elections to the Parliament of the United Kingdom in County Antrim constituencies
20th century in County Antrim
1919 elections in Ireland